Mariño is a municipality of Sucre State, Venezuela. The capital is Irapa.

Municipalities of Sucre (state)